Faith Baptist Bible College & Theological Seminary is a private Baptist Bible college based in Tedim, Chin State and in Yangon, Myanmar.

History 
The college and seminary was founded in 1986 by Dr Do Suan Mung. The two schools offer bachelor's, and master's degrees related to theology.

Programs 
Faith Baptist Bible College
(BABS) Bachelor of Arts in Biblical Studies (Full-time four-year program)
(BAMin) Bachelor of Arts in Ministry (Full-time four-year program)
(BAEng) Bachelor of Arts in English will be introduced in the near future. (Full-time four-year program)

Faith Baptist Theological Seminary 
(M.Div.) Master of Divinity (Full-time two-year program)
(MA/TM) Master of Arts in Theology and Ministry will be introduced in the near future. (Part-time two-year program)
(MA/CE) Master of Arts in Christian Education/Early Childhood Education will be introduced in the near future. (Part-time two-year program)
(D.Min.) Doctor of Ministry will be introduced in the near future. (Part-time five-year program)

References

Bible colleges
Seminaries and theological colleges in Myanmar
1986 establishments in Burma
Christian organizations established in 1986